Martyr (French: Martyre) is a 1927 French silent drama film directed by Charles Burguet and starring Charles Vanel, Suzy Vernon, and Jean Angelo.

Cast
 Charles Vanel
 Maxime Desjardins
 Desdemona Mazza
 Suzy Vernon
 Jean Angelo
 Camille Bardou
 Georges Flateau
 Suzanne Delvé
 Suzanne Munte
 Maurice Sibert
 Renée van Delly
 Marguerite de Morlaye

References

Bibliography
 Alfred Krautz. International directory of cinematographers, set- and costume designers in film, Volume 4. Saur, 1984.

External links

1927 films
Films directed by Charles Burguet
French silent feature films
French drama films
1927 drama films
French films based on plays
French black-and-white films
Silent drama films
1920s French films
1920s French-language films